The Herne Hill Harriers is an amateur athletics sports club based at Tooting Bec Athletics Track in Tooting Bec, London. The club was founded in the Herne Hill district of London in 1889. The club caters to all levels and ages of track, field, road running and cross-country running. The club begins training athletes at age 11 and offers “Star Track” an opportunity for younger children to get involved at the end of July each year.

Leagues
Herne Hill Harriers athletes are involved in a number of different leagues and competitions. The men's track and field team competes in the second and third division of the Southern men's league as well as the Rosenheim league involving other local clubs. The women's track and field team competes in the UK women's athletics league while younger athletes compete as a part of the National young athletes league as well as the Ebbisham and Lily B Leagues.

The club's cross-country athletes compete in the Surrey and East Surrey Cross Country Leagues each season as well as the South of Thames, Surrey, South of England and National Cross Country championships 
Road Runners at Herne Hill Harriers compete annually in the Surrey, South of England and National 6-stage Road relays in the autumn and in the longer 12-stage road relays in the spring as well as participating in the Surrey Road League over the summer months

Notable athletes

Former Olympians and European champions in athletics have run for the club including Olympic medalists Joe Deakin, David Jacobs, Herbert Johnston, Ernest Webb and Thomas Humphreys, as well as Harry Green, another Olympian who held a world best in the marathon, as well as Michael Maynard, part of the historic England Team that took gold at the 1957 International Cross Country Championships in San Sebastián, Spain.

International medalists

Olympic Games
Gold
Joe Deakin - 3 Miles Team Race - London - 1908
David Jacobs - 4 × 100 m (3rd leg) - Stockholm - 1912
Silver
Ernest Webb - 3,500m Walk and 10 Miles Walk - London -1908
Ernest Webb - 10,000m Walk - Stockholm - 1912
Herbert Johnston - 3,000m Team Race - Paris - 1924
Bronze
Thomas Humphreys - 8,000m Team Cross Country - Stockholm - 1912

European Championship
Silver
Jade Johnson - Long Jump - Munich - 2002

European Junior Championship

Gold
Uvie Ugono - 4 × 100 m (1st leg) - Ljublijana - 1997
Silver
John Boggis* - 3,000m - Paris - 1970

European Under 23 Championships
Gold
Jade Johnson - Long Jump - Amsterdam - 2001
Sabrina Scott - 4 × 100 m (3rd leg) - Amsterdam - 2001

European Under 20 Championships
Gold
Olivia Hines - 4 × 400 m (1st leg) - Grosseto - 2001

European Cross Country Championships
Silver
Benedict Whitby* - 10,000m Team Race - Dublin - 2009
Bronze
David Taylor* - 9,000m Team Race - Alnwick, Northumberland - 1995

Empire/Commonwealth Games
Silver
Terence Higgins - 4 x 440y (1st leg) - Auckland - 1950
Robert Setti - 4 x 440y (2nd leg) - Perth - 1962
Jade Johnson - Long Jump - Manchester - 2002
Bronze
Ernest Haley - 200m - London - 1911
Ian Boyd - 880y - Vancouver - 1954
Laurence Tait - 120y Hurdles - Perth - 1962
Sheikh Faye (Gambia) - High Jump - Edinburgh - 1970

European Masters Athletics Championship

Gold 

 Stuart Thurgood - Weight Throw -  Ismir, Turkey - 2014

Silver

Stuart Thurgood - M40 Hammer Throw -  Aarhus, Denmark - 2017

All medals won for Great Britain/England unless stated otherwise.

Kit 
The club vest consists of a crop top or vest with red and black horizontal stripes, with black shorts.

References

External links

Sports clubs established in 1889
Running clubs in the United Kingdom
1889 establishments in England
Athletics clubs in London
Athletics clubs in England